Radu Petrescu (born 19 April 1980) is a Romanian rugby referee who mainly referees club rugby in such tournaments as the Romanian SuperLiga.

Player career
Petrescu started playing rugby in 1990 with local team Grivița. At the end of his junior years he played for a short period of time for SuperLiga giants, Steaua. He ended his playing career just before moving to seniors, choosing to concentrate on his studies at the University of Bucharest.

Referee career
Petrescu started his refereeing career in 2000 and is considered by many one of the most valuable referees in Romanian Rugby. Petrescu refereed 3 matches at the 2011 IRB Junior World Rugby Trophy in Georgia. Besides officiating in Romanian SuperLiga, Petrescu has been called to officiate in other European and International competitions such as: IRB Nations Cup, European Professional Club Rugby, Rugby Europe International Championships.

References

External links

 

1980 births
Living people
Sportspeople from Bucharest
Romanian rugby union players
Romanian rugby union referees
CSA Steaua București (rugby union) players
Rugby union wings